Landscape with Dunes is an oil painting created in August 1883 by Vincent van Gogh during the time he lived at The Hague. It is currently held in a private collection.

See also
List of works by Vincent van Gogh

External links

Paintings by Vincent van Gogh
1883 paintings